The Mirror Boy is a 2011 Nigerian fantasy adventure drama film written and directed by Obi Emelonye, produced by Patrick Campbell and starring Genevieve Nnaji, Osita Iheme and Edward Kagutuzi. The film which was shot in England and the Gambia, received 3 nominations at the 2011 Africa Movie Academy Awards.

Plot 
The film tells the uplifting story of a young teenage African British boy who is taken back to the land of his mother's birth, but then gets mysteriously lost in a foreboding forest and embarks on a magical journey that teaches him about himself and the mystery of the father he has never seen.

Cast
Trew Sider - Rodney Marsh
Genevieve Nnaji - Teema
Osita Iheme - Mirror Boy
Edward Kagutuzi - Tijan
Fatima Jabbe - Queen
Emma Fletcher - Miss Nugent
Peter Halpin - PC Andrews

See also
 List of Nigerian films of 2011

References

External links
 
 

2011 films
Films directed by Obi Emelonye
English-language Nigerian films
2010s fantasy adventure films
Nigerian fantasy adventure films
Films set in the Gambia
Films shot in the Gambia
Nigerian drama films
2011 drama films
2010s English-language films